Noor Zadran (born 23 August 1994) is an Afghan international footballer who plays as a striker for Torns IF.

Career
On 27 November 2019 it was confirmed, that Zadran would join Torns IF for the 2020 season.

References

External links
Noor Zadran at Fotbolltransfers

1994 births
Living people
Afghan footballers
Afghanistan international footballers
Kvarnby IK players
FC Rosengård 1917 players
IFK Malmö Fotboll players
Landskrona BoIS players
Superettan players
Association football forwards
Afghan expatriate footballers
Afghan expatriate sportspeople in Sweden
Expatriate footballers in Sweden
Sportspeople from Khost
Torns IF players